Alexandre Wigand (1880 – 10 January 1958) was a Belgian footballer. He played in two matches for the Belgium national football team from 1904 to 1906.

References

External links
 

1880 births
1958 deaths
Belgian footballers
Belgium international footballers
Place of birth missing
Association football midfielders